Martin Kotásek (born October 26, 1973) is a Czech former professional ice hockey forward.

Kotásek played 416 games in the Czech Extraliga for HC Zlín, HC Kometa Brno, HC Vítkovice and HC Vsetín. He also played in the Tipsport Liga for HKm Nitra, the Belarusian Extraleague for HC Dinamo Minsk, the Ligue Magnus for Dauphins d'Épinal and the Polska Liga Hokejowa for Podhale Nowy Targ.

References

External links

1973 births
Living people
Czech ice hockey forwards
Dauphins d'Épinal players
HC Dinamo Minsk players
EHC Freiburg players
HC Havířov players
SHK Hodonín players
LHK Jestřábi Prostějov players
HC Kometa Brno players
Molot-Prikamye Perm players
HK Nitra players
Podhale Nowy Targ players
HC RT Torax Poruba players
HC ZUBR Přerov players
HC Slavia Praha players
Sportspeople from Zlín
HC Tábor players
HC Vítkovice players
VHK Vsetín players
PSG Berani Zlín players
Czechoslovak ice hockey forwards
Czech expatriate ice hockey players in Slovakia
Czech expatriate ice hockey players in Germany
Czech expatriate ice hockey players in Russia
Czech expatriate sportspeople in France
Czech expatriate sportspeople in Belarus
Czech expatriate sportspeople in Poland
Expatriate ice hockey players in France
Expatriate ice hockey players in Poland
Expatriate ice hockey players in Belarus